Soveli is a small village in dapooli, Ratnagiri district, Maharashtra state in Western India.

References

Villages in Ratnagiri district